David Arnold (born 1962) is an English film composer.

David Arnold may also refer to:
David Arnold (American football) (born 1966), football defensive back
David Arnold (basketball) (born 1990), American basketball player
David Arnold (conductor) (born 1951), British composer, conductor and music producer
David Arnold (historian) (born 1946), British historian
David Arnold (mathematician), American mathematician
 David Arnold, candidate in the United States House of Representatives elections in Missouri, 2010
David A. Arnold (1968–2022), American stand-up comedian
J. David Arnold, professor of psychology
David Arnold, vicar of St Paul's Church, Adlington
Dave Arnold (born 1971), American chef and museum founder
Dave Arnold (American football) (born 1944), football coach
Dave Arnold (politician) (1971–2021), American politician from Pennsylvania